This is a list of United Kingdom general elections (elections for the UK House of Commons) since the first in 1802. The members of the 1801–1802 Parliament had been elected to the former Parliament of Great Britain and Parliament of Ireland, before being co-opted to serve in the first Parliament of the United Kingdom, so that Parliament is not included in the table below. There have been 57 general elections held in the UK up to and including the December 2019 election.

Election results

In 1801, the right to vote in the United Kingdom was severely restricted. Universal suffrage, on an equal basis for men and women over the age of 21, was established in 1928. Before 1918, general elections did not occur on a single day and polling was spread over several weeks.

The majority figure given is for the difference between the number of MPs elected at the general election from the party (or parties) of the government, as opposed to all other parties (some of which may have been giving some support to the government, but were not participating in a coalition). The Speaker is excluded from the calculation. A negative majority means that there was a hung parliament (or minority government) following that election. For example, at the 1929 general election, Labour was 42 seats short of forming a majority, and so its majority is listed as −42. If the party in office changed the figure is re-calculated, but no allowance is made for changes after the general election.

No attempt is made to define a majority before 1832, when the Reform Act disenfranchised the rotten boroughs; before then the Tory party had an undemocratically entrenched dominance. Particularly in the early part of the period, the complexity of factional alignments, with both the Whig and Tory traditions tending to have some members in government and others in opposition factions simultaneously, make it impossible to produce an accurate majority figure. The figures between 1832 and about 1859 are approximate due to problems of defining what was a party in government, as the source provides figures for all Liberals rather than just the Whig component in what developed into the Liberal Party. The Whig and Peelite Prime Ministers in the table below are regarded as having the support of all Liberals.

List of elections

19th century

20th century

21st century

See also
 List of UK Conservative Party general election manifestos
 List of UK Labour Party general election manifestos
 List of UK Liberal Party general election manifestos
 Referendums in the United Kingdom

Notes

References 

General Elections

de:Britische Unterhauswahlen
sv:Parlamentsval i Storbritannien